Microsoft POSIX subsystem is one of four subsystems shipped with the first versions of Windows NT, the other three being the Win32 subsystem which provided the primary API for Windows NT, plus the OS/2 and security subsystems.

This subsystem implements only the POSIX.1 standard also known as IEEE Std 1003.1-1990 or ISO/IEC 9945-1:1990 primarily covering the kernel and C library programming interfaces which allowed a program written for other POSIX.1-compliant operating systems to be compiled and run under Windows NT. The Windows NT POSIX subsystem did not provide the interactive user environment parts of POSIX, originally standardized as POSIX.2. That is, Windows NT did not provide a POSIX shell nor any Unix commands out of the box, except for pax. The NT POSIX subsystem also did not provide any of the POSIX extensions that postdated the creation of Windows NT 3.1, such as those for POSIX Threads or POSIX IPC.

The NT POSIX subsystem was included with the first versions of Windows NT because of 1980s US federal government requirements listed in Federal Information Processing Standard (FIPS) 151-2. Briefly, these documents required that certain types of government purchases be POSIX-compliant, so that if Windows NT had not included this subsystem, computing systems based on it would not have been eligible for some government contracts. Windows NT versions 3.5, 3.51 and 4.0 were certified as compliant with FIPS 151-2.

The POSIX subsystem was replaced in Windows XP and Windows Server 2003 by "Windows Services for UNIX", (SFU) which is based in part on OpenBSD code and other technology developed by Interix, a company later purchased by Microsoft. SFU was removed from later versions of Windows 8 and Windows Server 2012. SFU is logically, though not formally, replaced by the Windows Subsystem for Linux (WSL) in the Windows 10 Anniversary Update and Windows Server 2016 Version 1709 respectively.

See also
 MKS Toolkit
 UWIN
 Cygwin
 UnxUtils
 Windows Subsystem for Linux

References

Further reading
 

Windows components
POSIX
Compatibility layers